Gurukhola is a village development committee (VDC) in Baitadi District in the Mahakali Zone of western Nepal. At the time of the 1991 Nepal census it had a population of 3,481 and had 600 houses in the town.

Villages which are a part of Gurukhola VDC include:
 Kande

References

Populated places in Baitadi District